Beaudine is a surname. Notable people with the surname include:

Harold Beaudine (1894–1949), American film director, brother of William
William Beaudine (1892–1970), American film actor and director